Tominanga sanguicauda is a species of fish in the subfamily Telmatherininae part of the family Melanotaeniidae, the rainbowfishes. It is endemic to Lake Towuti in Sulawesi, Indonesia.

Sources

External links
Tominanga sanguicauda on the National Center for Biotechnology Information taxonomy browser

sanguicauda
Freshwater fish of Indonesia
Taxonomy articles created by Polbot
Fish described in 1990